Saving Grace B. Jones is an independent feature written, produced, and directed by Connie Stevens. The film made its world premiere in the Philadelphia Film Festival/Cinefest on March 28, 2009, and screened in the 18th annual St. Louis International Film Festival on November 20, 2009. The film was released generally in the United States in December 2012. Filming took place in the town of Boonville, Missouri, in 2007.

Plot
Bea and Landy Bretthorse, a couple in a small Missouri town, are going to experience chaos when Landy's sister Grace is released from a local asylum and comes to live with the family in the summer leading up to the Great Flood of 1951.

Cast 
 Penelope Ann Miller as Bea Bretthorse
 Michael Biehn as Landy Bretthorse
 Tatum O'Neal as Grace B. Jones
 Evie Louise Thompson as Lucy Bretthorse
 Piper Laurie as Marta
 Joel Gretsch as Dan Jones
 Scott Wilson as Reverend Potter
 Tricia Leigh Fisher as Ella Jean Jones
 Rylee Fansler as Carrie
 Logan Alexander Moore as Sean Ryan
 Charles Taylor as Davey Lund
 Vincent Onofrio Monachino as Lem Bryerton
 Karen Errington as  Lynette Bryerton

References

External links 
 
 

2009 films
2009 drama films
Films set in 1951
Films set in Missouri
Films shot in Missouri